Indonesia–Sudan relations was officially established in 1960. In February 2012, during a visit of Sudanese Foreign Minister Ali Karti to Jakarta, Indonesia and Sudan has agreed to foster bilateral relations in politics, science, education and economic sectors. Indonesia has an embassy in Khartoum, while Sudan has an embassy in Jakarta. Both countries have Muslim-majority population and both are members of Organisation of Islamic Cooperation.

History
The historic relations between Indonesia and Sudan began earlier prior to the independence of Indonesia and Sudan. In 1910 an ulama from Sudan, Sheikh Ahmad Surkati came to Dutch East Indies and established Al Irsyad foundation that works in Islamic education up until now. In 1955 Sudan delegation attended the Asia Africa Conference in Bandung, Indonesia. Although at that time Sudan was still under British-Egypt rule, Indonesia showed its support by recognize Sudan a separate table from Egypt.

In 1960 the diplomatic relations between two nations was established and marked with the opening of Indonesian embassy in Khartoum. However, in 1967 Indonesian embassy in Khartoum was closed because of financial restraints, and reopened on January 6, 1996.

Trade and investment
Indonesian state oil and gas company Pertamina and private company Medco Energi International are conducting oil exploration in Sudan. Oil is Sudan main export to Indonesia, while Indonesia exports furniture, car batteries, cement and paper to Sudan. In April 2013 Indonesia and Sudan formed a Joint Technical Committee on Agriculture and Farming. To secure its textile industry and food security, Indonesia has expressed its interest to invest in agricultural and farming sector in Sudan, especially in cotton, sugar and rice plantations.

Notes

External links
Embassy of Republic of Indonesia in Khartoum, Sudan
Embassy of Sudan in Jakarta, Indonesia

 
Sudan
Bilateral relations of Sudan